The 2004 Abierto Mexicano de Tenis Telefonica Movistar was a tennis tournament played on outdoor clay courts. It was the 11th edition of the men's tournament (4th for the women) of the event known that year as the Abierto Mexicano de Tenis Telefonica Movistar, and was part of the International Series Gold of the 2004 ATP Tour, and of the Tier III Series of the 2004 WTA Tour. Both the men's and the women's events took place at the Fairmont Acapulco Princess in Acapulco, Mexico, from March 1 through March 7, 2004.

Finals

Men's singles

 Carlos Moyá defeated  Fernando Verdasco 6–3, 6–0
It was Carlos Moyá's 2nd title of the year, and his 16th of his career. It was his 2nd win at the event.

Women's singles

 Iveta Benešová  defeated  Flavia Pennetta 7–6(7–5), 6–4
It was Iveta Benešová's only title of the year and the 1st of her career.

Men's doubles

 Bob Bryan /  Mike Bryan defeated   Juan Ignacio Chela /  Nicolás Massú 6–2, 6–3
 It was Bob Bryan's 3rd title of the year and the 17th of his career. It was Mike Bryan's 3rd title of the year and the 19th of his career.

Women's doubles

 Lisa McShea /  Milagros Sequera defeated  Olga Blahotová /  Gabriela Navrátilová 2–6, 7–6(7–5), 6–4
 It was McShea's 1st title of the year and the 2nd of her career. It was Sequera's 1st title of the year and the 1st of her career.

External links
Official website
Men's Singles Draw
Men's Doubles Draw
Men's Qualifying Singles Draw
Women's Singles, Doubles and Qualifying Singles Draws

 
2004
Abierto Mexicano Telcel
Abierto Mexicano Telcel
March 2004 sports events in Mexico